Amleto Daissé (1906–1964) was an Italian cinematographer who worked for most of his career in Brazil.

Selected filmography
 Don Cesare di Bazan (1942)
 Angelina (1947)
 Iracema (1949)
 The Terrible Twosome (1953)
 Assalto ao Trem Pagador (1962)

References

Bibliography 
 Ramos, Fernão & Miranda, Luiz Felipe. Enciclopédia do cinema brasileiro. Senac, 2000.

External links 
 

1906 births
1964 deaths
Brazilian cinematographers
Italian cinematographers
Italian emigrants to Brazil